The Panama U-17 men's national football team is the national under-17 football team of Panama and is controlled by the Federación Panameña de Fútbol. The highest level of competition in which the team may compete is in the FIFA U-17 World Cup, which is held every two years.

UNCAF and CONCACAF U-17 Championship record 

1 Panama was invited after El Salvador declined its invitation.

FIFA U-17 World Cup record 

''*Draws include knockout matches decided on penalty kicks

Current squad

The following players were selected to play in the CONCACAF Under-17 Championship.

Head coach:   Mike Stump

Current squad

Fixtures and results

Honours
CONCACAF Under-17 Championship
 Runners-up (1): 2013

See also
 Federación Panameña de Fútbol
 FIFA U-17 World Cup
 CONCACAF Under-17 Championship

References

Central American national under-17 association football teams
F